Marko Dmitrović (born 24 January 1992) is a Serbian professional footballer who plays for Spanish club Sevilla as a goalkeeper.

Club career

Red Star Belgrade
Born in Subotica, Dmitrović was a Red Star Belgrade youth graduate, being promoted to the main squad in 2010.

Újpest
On 3 September 2013, after making no senior appearances for the side, he moved to Hungarian Nemzeti Bajnokság I club Újpest FC. He made his professional debut on 1 March 2014, starting in a 3–2 away loss against Budapest Honvéd FC. He finished the campaign with 12 appearances, as his side narrowly avoided relegation.

Charlton Athletic
On 6 January 2015, Dmitrović signed an 18-month contract with Charlton Athletic, for an undisclosed fee. He made his debut for the club on 24 January, starting in a 0–0 away draw against Wolverhampton Wanderers.

Alcorcón
On 27 July 2015, Dmitrović was loaned to Spanish Segunda División side AD Alcorcón, for one year. On 7 July of the following year, after being an undisputed starter, he signed a permanent three-year deal with the Community of Madrid side.

Eibar
On 23 June 2017, Dmitrović signed a four-year contract with SD Eibar in La Liga. He made his debut in the category on 21 August, starting in a 1–0 away win against Málaga CF. In May 2018, Dmitrović was elected for the best player of SD Eibar for the 2017–18 season. On 21 January 2021, he scored the first goal in his career from the penalty mark in a 2–1 defeat against Atlético Madrid.

Sevilla
On 4 July 2021, Dmitrović was announced as a new signing on a free agent contract by Sevilla FC, with a deal that runs until 2025.

International career
In August 2016, Dmitrović was named in Serbia's squad for a 2018 FIFA World Cup qualifier against Republic of Ireland. He made his debut on 14 November 2017 in a friendly match against South Korea.

In June 2018, he was selected in Serbia's squad for the 2018 FIFA World Cup in Russia, where he was unused backup to Vladimir Stojković.

In November 2022, he was selected in Serbia's squad for the 2022 FIFA World Cup in Qatar, but he didn't make any appearance there, as Vanja Milinković-Savić was the first-choice goalkeeper.

Career statistics

Club

International

Honours
Újpest
Hungarian Cup: 2013–14

References

External links

MLSZ profile 
HLSZ profile 

1992 births
Living people
Sportspeople from Subotica
Serbian footballers
Association football goalkeepers
Red Star Belgrade footballers
Nemzeti Bajnokság I players
Újpest FC players
English Football League players
Charlton Athletic F.C. players
La Liga players
Segunda División players
AD Alcorcón footballers
SD Eibar footballers
Sevilla FC players
Serbia youth international footballers
Serbia under-21 international footballers
Serbian expatriate footballers
Expatriate footballers in Hungary
Serbian expatriate sportspeople in Hungary
Expatriate footballers in England
Serbian expatriate sportspeople in England
Expatriate footballers in Spain
Serbian expatriate sportspeople in Spain
2018 FIFA World Cup players
2022 FIFA World Cup players
Serbia international footballers